The surname Hetherington is of English origin, derived from a like-named place in Northumberland. This placename is derived from Old English word elements—either hēahdēor ("stag", "deer"), or hǣddre ("heather"); in addition to the elements -ing ("characterized by"), and tūn ("farmstead", "settlement"). Early occurrences of the surname in English records are: de Hetherington (in 1298), de Hetherynton (in 1316), and Etherington (in 1672). A variant form of the surname is Heatherington, and perhaps Hetherton. Forms of the surname have been recorded in Ireland since the 16th century.

Hetherington can refer to:

People 
 Alastair Hetherington (1919–1999), British journalist
 Sir Arthur Hetherington (1911–2002), first chairman of British Gas
 Brian Hetherington, Australian rugby league footballer
 Chris Hetherington, American football fullback
 Sir Hector Hetherington (1888–1965), philosopher and Principal of the University of Glasgow
 Henry Hetherington (1792–1849), British Chartist
 Ian Hetherington, computer specialist
 Jason Hetherington, Australian rugby league footballer
 Jill Hetherington, professional tennis player from Canada
 John Hetherington, haberdasher
 Jos Hetherington (1892–1971), English footballer
 Judson Hetherington (1866–1928), physician and politician
 Kathleen Hetherington, American college administrator
 Norman Hetherington (1921-2010), Australian cartoonist and puppeteer
 Rachel Hetherington, Australian professional golfer 
 Richard Hetherington, British naval officer and politician
 Roger Hetherington (1908–1990), British civil engineer
 Roger Gaskell Hetherington (1876–1952), British civil engineer and civil servant
 Stephen Hetherington, Australian philosopher
 Thomas Hetherington (1926–2007), British lawyer
 Thomas Hetherington (politician) (1815–1913), Canadian politician
 Thomas Gerard Hetherington (1886–1951), British officer who helped develop the tank
 Tim Hetherington (1970–2011), British photographer, winner of 2007 World Press Photo
 Rev William Maxwell Hetherington FRSE (1803–1865), Scottish minister and historian

Other 
 2011 Hetherington House Occupation
 6127 Hetherington, an asteroid

References 

English toponymic surnames